The Chicago Bears are an American football franchise based in Chicago, Illinois. They are members of the NFC North, a division of the National Football Conference (NFC) in the National Football League (NFL). Every year in Spring, the NFL hosts a collegiate draft, commonly known as the "NFL Draft". Franchises that did poorly the season prior are favored in the draft, with the order determined by record. The team with the worst record picks first, then in reverse order. The order of playoff teams is determined by round eliminated, with the team with the worst record eliminated in each round selecting first among the eliminated teams, similar to the order for non-playoff teams. The winner of the previous season's Super Bowl selects last in the first round. Teams may trade draft picks for players, money, or other picks.

 The Bears first selection was Joe Stydahar, a tackle from the  West Virginia University, who is inducted in the Pro Football Hall of Fame, and their most recent first-round selection was Justin Fields, a quarterback from Ohio State. They have not had first-round selections a total of eight times, most recently in 2022, and have only selected the number-one overall pick in the draft twice, choosing Tom Harmon in 1941 and Bob Fenimore in 1947. The team's six selections from the University of Texas are the most chosen by the Bears from one program. Nine of their first-round selections have been inducted into the Pro Football Hall of Fame.

Key

Player selections

References 
 
 
 
 
 
 
 
 
 
 
 
 
 
 
 
 
 
 

Lists of first-round draft picks by National Football League team

First round draft picks